Kenneth Francis Ruettgers (born August 20, 1962) is a former National Football League offensive tackle who played for the Green Bay Packers from 1985 to 1996.

High school career
Ruettgers attended Garces Memorial High School (Bakersfield, California) and was a good student and a standout in football. His two younger brothers, Steven and Paul, graduated from Garces Memorial as well, while his younger sister Laura Jane Ruettgers graduated from Highland many years later.

College career
Ruettgers played college football at the University of Southern California, where he was named to the All-Pac-10 Conference Team in 1984. He blocked for Rodney Peete and Heisman Trophy winner Marcus Allen.

Professional career
After graduating from USC, Ruettgers was drafted in the first round of the 1985 NFL Draft (7th pick) by Green Bay where he remained throughout his professional career. He was the Green Bay Packers' 1989 offensive MVP.  He began the 1996 season on the Physically Unable to Perform List. He was activated after four games, but injuries had taken their toll and he could not finish the season.

In December 2013, Ruettgers was named as an inductee into the Green Bay Packers Hall of Fame. The induction ceremony took place on July 19, 2014, at the Lambeau Field Atrium. He became the 150th member to be inducted into the Green Bay Packer Hall of Fame along with Ahman Green.

Post football
After a successful career in the NFL, Ruettgers moved to Oregon. After a brief stint in the publishing industry, he founded GamesOver.org, a non-profit group dedicated to help former professional athletes cope with the stresses of retirement.

Ruettgers has a B.A. in business administration from USC's Marshall School of Business, and an MBA from California State University, Bakersfield. He received a Ph.D. in sociology from Oxford Graduate School in Dayton, Tennessee, in 2007. Later, he began teaching sociology classes part-time at Central Oregon Community College. Students found out that he had been a football player when they found his Wikipedia entry. He has also begun coaching football at a local high school in Sisters, Oregon.

Personal life
He is married with three children. His oldest son, Matthew, died in a motorcycle accident in 2012.

References

1962 births
Living people
American football offensive linemen
USC Trojans football players
Green Bay Packers players
People from Bakersfield, California
People from Sisters, Oregon